Regina Maria Pinto da Fonseca Ramos Bastos (born 4 November 1960) is a Portuguese lawyer and former politician. She was a member of the European parliament from 1999 to 2004 and from 2009 to 2014 as a member of the European People's Party.

She was born in Estarreja and holds a bachelor's degree in law. She was a member of the Portuguese Social Democratic Party. She served in the municipal assembly for Estarreja from 1989 to 2001. After serving in the European parliament, she was a member of the Portuguese Assembly of the Republic from 2005 until 2009, when she was again elected to the European parliament. In 2011, she was named to the short list for the prize for the Best Member of the European Parliament.

Bastos served as president of the municipal assembly for Estarreja from 2005 to 2009.

References 

1960 births
Living people
Women members of the Assembly of the Republic (Portugal)
MEPs for Portugal 1999–2004
MEPs for Portugal 2009–2014
Social Democratic Party (Portugal) MEPs
20th-century women MEPs for Portugal
21st-century women MEPs for Portugal
20th-century Portuguese politicians
21st-century Portuguese politicians
Members of the Assembly of the Republic (Portugal)